The Selebi-Phikwe Solar Power Station, is a  solar power plant under development in Botswana. It is owned and is being developed by Scatec, the multinational energy conglomerate, whose headquarters are located in Oslo, Norway. The off-taker is Botswana Power Corporation (BPC), under a 25-year power purchase agreement (PPA).

Location
The power station would be located in the town of Selebi-Phikwe, in the Central District of Botswana.

Overview
The design calls for a ground-mounted solar farm, with capacity generation of 50 megawatts. Its output is to be sold directly to Botswana Power Company for integration into the national grid. The power is to be distributed to approximately 20,000 Botswana households. The power station will facilitate the country to forego the emission of 48,000 tonnes of carbon dioxide annually.

Developers
The solar farm is under development by Scatec, the Norwegian renewable energy Independent power producer (IPP). Scatec is also the engineering, procurement and construction (EPC) contractor, asset manager as well as the operations and maintenance (O&M) company.

Other considerations
As of September 2022, Botswana's installed electricity generation capacity was 450 MW. The country imports an additional 150 MW from neighboring South Africa. At that time national demand was estimated at 550 MW. The government of Botswana has plans to increase its installed capacity by developing new solar power stations, thereby achieving energy autonomy from South Africa. This power station is part of those efforts.

See also

List of power stations in Botswana

Notes

References

External links
 Scatec Official Webpage

Solar power stations in Botswana
Central District (Botswana)
Proposed solar power stations
Energy infrastructure in Africa
Photovoltaic power stations in Botswana